Harry Smith is the name of:

Sports

Baseball
 Harry Smith (infielder) (1856–1898), American baseball player
 Harry Smith (pitcher) (1889–1964), American baseball player
 Harry Smith (1900s catcher) (1874–1933), British-born baseball player & manager
 Harry Smith (1910s catcher) (1890–1922), American baseball player

Cricket
 Harry Smith (Australian cricketer) (1887–1916), Australian cricketer, played first-class cricket for Tasmania and Victoria
 Harry Smith (cricketer, born 1884) (1884–1935), South African cricketer
 Harry Smith (cricketer, born 1886) (1886–1955), English cricketer, for Derbyshire and Warwickshire
 Harry Smith (cricketer, born 1890) (1890–?), English cricketer, played first-class cricket for Essex
 Harry Smith (cricketer, born 1891) (1891–1937), English Test cricketer

Football
 Harry Smith (American football) (1918–2013), American football player
 Harry Smith (footballer, born 1885) (1885–?), footballer for Stoke and Walsall
 Harry Smith (footballer, born 1893) (1893–1960), Australian rules footballer for Fitzroy and Geelong
 Harry Smith (footballer, born 1894), English footballer for Northampton Town
 Harry Smith (footballer, born 1901), English footballer for Clapton Orient
 Harry Smith (footballer, born 1904) (1900–?), English footballer for West Ham United
 Harry Smith (footballer, born 1908) (1908–1993), English footballer for Nottingham Forest, Darlington and Bristol Rovers
 Harry Smith (footballer, born 1916) (1916–1983), Australian rules footballer for Richmond
 Harry Smith (footballer, born 1930), English footballer for Chester in 1950s
 Harry Smith (footballer, born 1932), English footballer for Torquay United and Bristol City
 Harry Smith (footballer, born 1995), English footballer for Leyton Orient F.C.
 Harry Smith (soccer) (1907–1983), American soccer full back
 Harry Smith (Scottish footballer), Scottish footballer

Other sports
 Harry Smith (coach), Tampa Bay Buccaneers strength coach (1976–1979)
 Harry Smith (ice hockey, born 1935) (1935–2020), Canadian ice hockey player
 Harry Smith (ice hockey, born 1883) (1883–1953), Canadian ice hockey player
 Harry Smith (rugby league) (born 2000), rugby league footballer
 Harry Smith (rugby union), Scottish rugby union player
 Harry Smith (runner) (1888–1962), American marathoner and great-grandfather of pro wrestler Harry Smith
 Harry Smith, known as Davey Boy Smith Jr. (born 1985), Canadian professional wrestler and great-grandson of American marathoner Harry Smith

Arts
 Harry B. Smith (1860–1936), American songwriter
 Harry Everett Smith (1923–1991), American music anthologist, experimental film maker, visual artist
 Harry James Smith (1880–1918), American playwright and novelist
 Harry Smith (poet) (1936–2012), American poet and editor

Journalism
 Harry Clay Smith (1863–1941), African American newspaper editor and politician
 Harry Leslie Smith (1923–2018), British writer and political commentator
 Harry Smith (American journalist) (born 1951), US broadcast journalist
 Harry Smith (British journalist) (1951–2020), British broadcast journalist

Military
 Sir Harry Smith, 1st Baronet (1787–1860), British soldier
 Harry Smith (Australian soldier) (born 1933), senior officer of the Australian Army

Politics
 Harry Smith (MP) (1829–1910), British politician in Falkirk Burghs
 Harry Smith (Alberta politician) (1873–1928), Canadian politician

Science and academia
 Harry Scott Smith (1883–1957), American entomologist
 Harry Smith (microbiologist) (1921–2011), British microbiologist
 Harry Smith (Egyptologist) (born 1928), British Egyptologist and academic
 Harry Smith (botanist) (1935–2015), British botanist

Places
 Harrismith, a large town in Free State province, South Africa, named after the 1st Baronet
 Harrismith, Western Australia

Other
 Harry Lester Smith, American Methodist bishop

See also
Henry Smith (disambiguation)
Harold Smith (disambiguation)
Harrison Smith (disambiguation)
Harry Smyth (1910–1992), Canadian speed skater
Harry Smythe (1904–1980), baseball player